The Dubai Desert Conservation Reserve, DDCR, is a  natural reserve in the emirate of Dubai in the United Arab Emirates. It was established by Emiri decree on 9 January 2002 and comprises some 5% of the Emirate of Dubai's total landmass.

It is home to the Al Maha Desert Resort and Spa. Now it has been became one of the most popular activity all across the world and been visited every season and been practiced desert safari in Red Sand Dunes of Dubai by thousands of visitor came from all across the world.

References

External links
 Official website
 DDCR on TripAdvisor

 Nature reserves in the United Arab Emirates
 Geography of Dubai